The Whilamut Passage Bridge 
is a pair of bridges across the Willamette River in Eugene, Oregon, U.S.  The west span was completed in 2011.  The east span was completed and opened in August 2013.  They carry Interstate 5 traffic and replaced an earlier bridge completed in 1961. Construction on the bridges began in 2009 and cost $204 million.

See also 

 List of crossings of the Willamette River
Knickerbocker Bicycle Bridge—nearby bicycle bridge running parallel to the Whilamut Passage Bridge over the Millrace

References 

Interstate 5
Buildings and structures in Eugene, Oregon
Bridges in Lane County, Oregon
Bridges over the Willamette River
Road bridges in Oregon
Bridges on the Interstate Highway System
2011 establishments in Oregon
Open-spandrel deck arch bridges in the United States